Lazar Naumovich Berman (Lazarʹ Naumovič Berman; February 26, 1930February 6, 2005) was a Soviet Russian classical pianist, Honoured Artist of the RSFSR (1988). He was hailed for a huge, thunderous technique that made him a thrilling interpreter of Liszt and Rachmaninoff and a late representative of the grand school of Russian Romantic pianism. Emil Gilels described him as a "phenomenon of the musical world".

Biography

Berman was born to Jewish parents in Leningrad. His mother, Anna Lazarevna Makhover, had played the piano herself until prevented by hearing problems. She introduced her son to the piano at the age of two. Berman entered his first competition at the age of three, and recorded a Mozart fantasia and a mazurka that he had composed himself at the age of seven, before he could even read music.

Berman was first noticed while participating in city young talents competition. The jury under the chairmanship of Leonid Nikolaev noticed the child's "rare exceptional case of musical and piano skills". Now, after being officially given title  "prodigy" at the age of four, he started studying with Leningrad State Conservatory professor, Samariy Savshinsky.

In 1939 when Berman was nine, the family moved to Moscow so that he could study with Aleksandr Goldenweiser, first at Central musical school, and then at the Conservatoire, where he graduated in 1953. In 1940, he made his formal debut playing Mozart's Piano Concerto No. 25 with the Moscow Philharmonic Orchestra. In 1941, students, pupils and parents were evacuated to Kuibishev, a city on the Volga, because of World War II. Living conditions were so poor that his mother had to cut the fingers from a pair of gloves to allow him to continue to practise without freezing his hands.

He subsequently began to acquire international prominence. At the age of 12 he played Franz Liszt's La campanella to a British audience over the radio. In 1956 became a laureate of two international piano competitions: Queen Elisabeth Music Competition in Belgium, with Vladimir Ashkenazy, and Franz Liszt in Budapest, Hungary. As a result of these accomplishments, Berman was offered an international tour, and landed a recording deal, which included recordings of Liszt's sonata and Beethoven's "Appassionata". In 1958, he performed in London and recorded for SAGA.

From 1959 to 1971 Berman was not allowed to travel abroad due to his marriage to a French national (the marriage soon fell apart); however, he continued to tour around Soviet Union, and did some recordings at "Melodia" studio, including Liszt's Transcendental etudes. That recording became one of the first soviet recordings done with the use of Stereo technology. From mid 1970s Mr. Berman was again allowed to tour abroad, which he did to high acclaim.

In 1968 he married Valentina Sedova and in 1970 their son, Pavel, was born.

Although he was known to international music aficionados who had heard the occasional recording on the Russian Melodiya record label, as well as those who visited the Soviet Union, he was not generally well known outside Russia before his 1975 American tour, organised by the impresario Jacques Leiser. His now legendary New York debut at the 92 Street Y, where he played Liszt's Transcendental Études, struck the music world like lightning. He became an overnight sensation. Before that, he had been generally restricted to the Soviet concert circuit, playing on old and decrepit pianos to audiences of varied degrees of interest. Invitations to tour outside the Soviet Union were ignored by the Soviet state concert agency, Gosconcert. He lived in a tiny two-room apartment in Moscow, with a grand piano occupying an entire room. But after his 1975 tour, he was immediately in great demand, with Deutsche Grammophon, EMI, and CBS vying to record him. He recorded the Tchaikovsky First Piano Concerto with Herbert von Karajan, as well as broadcasting it on international television with Antal Doráti, to mark United Nations Day in 1976.

His playing of Chopin is well documented, in both a concert film and a DGG recording of the polonaises from the 1970s.

Most of his British appearances came in the late 1970s and early 1980s. In December 1976, he performed music by Sergei Prokofiev and Franz Liszt at the Royal Festival Hall.

In 1980, at the height of his popularity, Berman again was barred from leaving Soviet Union. This time it was because a book by an American writer (censored in the USSR) was found in his luggage while he was passing custom in Moscow's airport.

In August 1990 Berman left USSR for Norway, followed by final relocation to Italy, where he became a teacher. Four years later he became Italian citizen, and the following year he got invited to Musical School of Weimar, Germany, where he continued teaching until 2000. He often performed along with his son, violinist Pavel Berman.

Berman died in 2005, survived by his second wife, Valentina Sedova, also a pianist, and their son, talented violinist and conductor Pavel Berman. His students included Sonya Bach, Italian pianists Giuliano Mazzocante, Maurizio Baglini, Enrico Elisi, and Enrico Pace, Vladimir Stoupel, Rutsuko Yamagishi, Ioana Lupascu, Gintaras Januševičius, Vardan Mamikonian, Rueibin Chen, Antonio Formaro and Viktoriya Yermolyeva.

Berman is buried at the Cimitero delle Porte Sante in Florence. The epitaph on his burial stone says: "You and your music are always with us".

References

External links

Obituary in The Times
Lazar Berman commercial discography
PIANO: LAZAR BERMAN - New York Times
 Lazar Berman Biography by Erik Eriksson

1930 births
2005 deaths
Russian classical pianists
Male classical pianists
Soviet classical pianists
Italian classical pianists
Italian male pianists
20th-century classical pianists
Jewish classical pianists
Russian Jews
Musicians from Saint Petersburg
Prize-winners of the Queen Elisabeth Competition
Honored Artists of the RSFSR
20th-century Italian male musicians